Tobias Sjögren (born 23 October 1970 in Gothenburg) is a Swedish jazz guitarist and composer, a graduate master of arts (1996), among others known from solo albums like Hymn (1994) and Tobias Sjögren (2002) and several cooperation. composed music to poems by Gunnar Ekelöf released on the album Ord På Golvet (1995) with Joakim Milder (saxophone) and Johannes Lundberg (bass). He collected grønlandsk musikk (1995) together with saxophonist Christian Vuust. This music can be heard on several of his albums, like The Thule Spirit (Virgin Records 1997), where the Norwegian trumpeter Per Jørgensen contributes in the trio.

Since 1993, he contributed on several albums with Lars Danielssons band European Voices together with Nils Petter Molvær and Marilyn Mazur, among others.
He has led the trio Northern Voices with Vuust and Audun Kleive (1998–) which has resulted in Shaman (Q-rious music, 2003).
With Per Jørgensen, which he has worked with since 1990, he released Unspoken songs (Curling Legs, 2006)
with his own compositions in a hushed Pat Metheny-style, also performed at the 2006 MaiJazz in Stavanger, Norway.

He composed music to the ballet Meget Krafigt Glemt (København, 1996) by Thomas Eisenhardt, as well as the installation performance Mörker (Gothenburg 2000).

References

External links 
 
 Underneath – Tobias Sjögren & Per Jørgensen on YouTube

1970 births
People from Gothenburg
Swedish jazz guitarists
Male jazz musicians
Swedish jazz composers
Male jazz composers
20th-century Swedish musicians
21st-century Swedish musicians
Living people
21st-century guitarists
20th-century Swedish male musicians
21st-century Swedish male musicians